The 2013 Maryland Terrapins men's soccer team was the college's 68th season of playing organized men's college soccer. The Terrapins played in the Atlantic Coast Conference where they emerged as the regular season and tournament champions. The Terrapins finished the season as the NCAA runner-up, losing the college cup final to Notre Dame.

Roster

Competitions

Preseason

Regular season

ACC Standings

Results summary

Results by round

Match results

ACC Tournament

NCAA Tournament

College Cup

See also 
2013 Atlantic Coast Conference men's soccer season
2013 Atlantic Coast Conference Men's Soccer Tournament

References 

Maryland Terrapins
Maryland Terrapins men's soccer seasons
Maryland Terrapins
Maryland Terrapins
NCAA Division I Men's Soccer Tournament College Cup seasons
2013